Zamora may refer to:

Places and jurisdictions

Europe

Spain
 Zamora, Spain, a city in the autonomous community of Castilla y León
 Province of Zamora, a province in the autonomous community of Castilla y León
 Associated with the city and province:
 Roman Catholic Diocese of Zamora in Spain, Roman Catholic suffragan bishopric, named after its see
 Zamora (Spanish Congress Electoral District)
 Zamora (Cortes of Castile and León constituency)
 Zamora (Senate constituency)

Romania
 Zamora, a tributary of the Valea de Pești in Hunedoara County
 Zamora, a tributary of the Prahova in Prahova County

Americas

Canada
 Zamora, British Columbia, a former community in the Boundary region

Ecuador
 Zamora, Ecuador, a city in the province of Zamora-Chinchipe
 Zamora-Chinchipe Province
 Zamora River, a river in the provinces of Loja, Zamora-Chinchipe and Morona-Santiago
 Zamora Canton, in the province of Zamora-Chinchipe
 Apostolic Vicariate of Zamora en Ecuador, Roman Catholic missionary circonscription, named after its see

Mexico
 Zamora, Michoacán, a city in the state of Michoacán
 Roman Catholic Diocese of Zamora (in Mexico), Roman Catholic suffragan bishopric, named after its see
 Zamora Municipality, Michoacán, a municipality in the state of Michoacán
 Gutiérrez Zamora, Veracruz, a municipality in the state of Veracruz

United States
 Zamora, California, an unincorporated community in Yolo County

Venezuela
 Zamora, Aragua, a municipality in the state of Aragua
 Zamora, Falcón, a municipality in the state of Falcón
 Zamora, Miranda, a municipality in the state of Miranda
 Zamora Province (Venezuela), in existence from 1862 to 1866

People
 Bengt "Zamora" Nyholm, Swedish footballer
 Zamora (surname), a Spanish surname, including a list of people with the name
 Zamora (pianist) (born 1979), Venezuelan musician
 Zamora the Torture King (born 1963), American circus performer

Sports
 Club Deportivo Zamora, a Mexican football team
 FS Zamora, a Spanish futsal team
 Ricardo Zamora Trophy, a Spanish football award
 Zamora CF a Spanish football team
 Zamora FC, a Venezuelan football team

Other uses
 Mission Zamora, a Venezuelan land reform programme
 Zamora (Conan the Barbarian), a fictional nation in the American pulp magazine series Conan the Barbarian
 Zamora TV, a Venezuelan television station
 Zamora, a fictional monk portrayed in The Book of Mirdad by Mikha'il Na'ima

See also
 Lomas de Zamora 
 
 Zamor (disambiguation)